Ice hockey in Bulgaria is governed by the Bulgarian Ice Hockey Federation. The Bulgarian Hockey League, the top level of Bulgarian hockey, was founded in 1952. Bulgarian men's, women's, and junior national teams participate at the World Championships. Bulgaria has been a member of the IIHF since July 25, 1960.

References

External links
Country profile on IIHF.com